Ágatha Blumenthal, also known by the Spanish name Águeda Flores (1541, Talagante – Santiago, August 1632), was a mixed-race Chilean landowner, daughter of Bartolomé Blumenthal and the Inca Princess Elvira of Talagante (daughter of the respected chief Tala Canta Ilabe) and grandmother to Catalina de los Ríos y Lisperguer (La Quintrala).

Águeda owned large portions of land in Talagante, Quilicura, Peñalolén, Cauquenes and Putagán, making her the richest woman of the colonial period in Chile.

See also
  and Bartolomé Blumenthal.
The German Bartholomeus Blumenthal Welzer (Bartolomé Flores'' in Spanish) accompanied Pedro de Valdivia in the Conquest of Chile.

References

1541 births
1632 deaths
16th-century Spanish businesspeople
16th-century Chilean people
17th-century landowners
16th-century landowners
17th-century Spanish businesspeople
Chilean people of German descent